Božena Moserová (30 June 1926 – 9 February 2017) was a Czech alpine skier who competed in the 1948 Winter Olympics.

Moserová died on 9 February 2017, at the age of 90.

References

1926 births
2017 deaths
Alpine skiers at the 1948 Winter Olympics
Czech female alpine skiers
Czechoslovak female alpine skiers
Olympic alpine skiers of Czechoslovakia